Kefersteinia graminea is an orchid found in Venezuela, Colombia, and Ecuador. Euglossine bees pollinate the species.

Description
It flowers in the summer and fall.

References

Plants described in 1881
Orchids of South America
Zygopetalinae